The Prescott Estate is a historic residential estate at 770 Centre Street in Newton, Massachusetts.  The main house, a c. 1874 Medieval Revival structure, is a rare local example of residential stone construction, and of the architectural style.  Although it was built by Henry Pazolt, a Boston cigar merchant, it soon afterward (c. 1886) came into the Prescott family.  In 1954 it was acquired by the Carroll Center for the Blind.  In addition to the main house, the estate includes a period carriage house and garage.

The estate was listed on the National Register of Historic Places in 1986.

See also
 National Register of Historic Places listings in Newton, Massachusetts

References

Houses on the National Register of Historic Places in Newton, Massachusetts
Houses completed in 1885